Royères in a commune in the Haute-Vienne department in the Nouvelle-Aquitaine region in west-central France.

Personalities
Royères was the birthplace of the Dominican inquisitor, Bishop of Lodève and prolific author Bernard Gui, circa 1261.

See also
Communes of the Haute-Vienne department

References

External links

Royères at General Annuaires France

Communes of Haute-Vienne